An urban castle is a castle that is located within a medieval town or city or is integrated into its fortifications. 

In most cases, the town or city grew up around or alongside the castle (for example in Halle, Brunswick and Prague), or the castle was built in order to reinforce the defences within or as part of the line of fortification ringing the settlement as, for example, at Erfurt.

Definitions 
Creighton draws a distinction between the 'urban castle', where the castle is built in or onto an existing town, and the 'castle borough', "where a primary castle attracts a secondary borough or the two are planned together," although he acknowledges that the division between the two is not always clear-cut.

Instrument of sovereign power 
The urban castle was also be used as an instrument of power, for example by William the Conqueror in Norman England, or by territorial lords in the Holy Roman Empire when towns in the late Middle Ages were increasingly striving for their independence. In such cases the urban castle was integrated into a strategically favourable point in the city wall so that the lord could enter the castle from the fields outside unhindered by the citizens and, through another gateway in the castle walls facing the city, could leave the castle and enter the city.

Examples

Austria 
 Krems in Lower Austria, has the Gozzoburg, a high mediaeval urban castle.

Czech Republic 
Prague Castle in Prague

Germany 
There are examples of urban castles in:
 Andernach in Rhineland-Palatinate where the Electoral Cologne Stadtburg (designed as a water castle) as an instrument of power
 Erfurt with its Petersberg Citadel, which is integrated into the defensive system of the old fortified city
 Esslingen am Neckar: the original outposts on the Schönenberg were gradually incorporated into the town fortifications through the construction of branching walls (Schenkelmauern). Due to the geological situation there, the cost was very high.
 Feuchtwangen in Bavaria still has, in the remains of its town walls, a picturesque link to the site of Little Ottingen Castle (Öttingischen Schlösschen), a former water castle, which juts out from the otherwise circular town wall. Later a small hunting lodge was built on the site
 Friedberg in Hesse has an imperial castle  
 Horn-Bad Meinberg in North Rhine-Westphalia has Horn Castle, a castle built into the town's defences 
 Nuremberg: the double castle is incorporated into the city wall
 Schlitz in Hesse, one of the best-known examples of urban castles in Germany with four castles. 
 Warburg has Wartberch Castle.
 Weißenstein with the old castle of Schloss Weißenstein

Ethiopia 
Emperor Fasilides' Castle (part of the Fasil Ghebbi complex) in Gondar

Finland
Turku Castle in Finland

Hungary 
Buda Castle in Budapest
Sárospatak Castle in Sárospatak

Poland 
Wawel Castle in Krakow (part of the Wawel fortified complex of the Krakow Old Town)

Romania 
Brașov Old Town Fortress, Brașov

Slovakia 
Bratislava Castle in Bratislava (fortified site history preceding adjacent city)
Trenčín Castle in Trenčín
Nitra Castle in Nitra (parallel evolution of the castle and the city since the early Middle Ages)  
Old Castle (Starý zámok) in Banská Štiavnica (secondary Old Town development, late Middle Ages)
New Castle (Nový zámok) in Banská Štiavnica (secondary Old Town development, Renaissance)
Kremnica Castle in Kremnica (secondary Old Town development, late Middle Ages)
Podolínec Castle in Podolínec
Kežmarok Castle in Kežmarok

Ukraine 
 Uzhorod Castle in Uzhorod

United Kingdom 
The Tower of London has been called "the most complete of urban castles", and an "archetypally oppressive castle." Other examples include:
 Baile Hill, York
 Banbury Castle
 Baynard's Castle
 Bristol Castle
 Castle Acre
 Caernarvon Castle
 Conway Castle
 Flint Castle
 Mountfichet Castle
 Oxford Castle
 Rhuddlan Castle

Gallery

References

External links 
 Creighton, O.H. Castles and Landscapes: Power, Community and Fortification in Medieval England. London: Equinox, 2002. .
 Pounds, N.J.G. The Medieval Castle in England and Wales: A social and political history. Cambridge: CUP, 1994. .
 Wheatley, Abigail. "The Urban Castle" in The Idea of the Castle in Medieval England, York: York Medieval Press, 2004. 44-77. .

 
Castles by type